The 2013–14 season was Bradford City's 111th season in their history, their 99th in the Football League and 101st in the league system of English football. It was their first season back in League One following six years in League Two, after they beat Northampton Town 3–0 in the 2012–13 League Two Playoff Final.

Pre-season
Former sponsors JCT600 signed a three-year deal to become the club's main shirt sponsors once again after a seven-year absence. Coach Phil Parkinson signed a new three-year deal with the club, along with assistant Steve Parkin and Head of Sports Science Nick Allamby.

Parkinson took up one-year options on Jon McLaughlin, Gary Jones, Kyel Reid and Garry Thompson to keep them at the club for another season, while Andrew Davies signed a new two-year contract to stay with the Bantams. However, Steve Williams and Dean Overson were released after being deemed surplus to the club's requirements. Goalkeeper Matt Duke also left the Bantams to join League Two side Northampton Town, Duke stated that he loved his time at Bradford but at 36 years of age he is looking for more 1st team football. Parkinson announced that he had released winger Zavon Hines stating that the winger needed first team football and Bradford could not promise him that. The first signing of the season came as the Bantams announced that they had signed Rochdale midfielder Jason Kennedy on a 2 Year Deal. On the same day, young defender Carl McHugh also signed a 1 Year Extension to his contract after an impressive 2012–13 campaign. Another important player for the Bantams, Nathan Doyle, also signed a 1 Year Extension after impressing the coach and becoming a key figure in the Bradford side.

The second signing of the campaign came as Parkinson signed Watford winger Mark Yeates on a 2 Year Deal. Winger Will Atkinson left Bradford as he signed a 2 Year Deal with League Two side Southend United. During pre-season it was announced that trialist Raffaele De Vita had signed a 1 Year Deal with Bradford. Bradford announced that they had signed defender Matt Taylor from Charlton Athletic on a 2 Year Deal whilst Michael Nelson leaves City to join Scottish side Hibernian.

Pre-season and friendlies
The Bantams started their pre-season with a 4–0 win against Guiseley. Bradford opened the scoring early with Alan Connell before the game evened out a little. Finally in the 73rd minute Nahki Wells rounded a defender and the keeper to score. This opened the floodgates and Ricky Ravenhill scored City's 3rd before trial player Raffaele De Vita scored the goal of the game to finish the scoring.

The next part of the Bantams pre-season was a tour of Ireland. They started this tour with a 4–1 win against Athlone Town. The Irish opened the scoring as Bradford defender James Meredith scored an own goal in the 23rd minute, however this was short lived as last season's top scorer Nahki Wells drove a shot into the bottom corner to equalize. The Bantams took the lead 8 minutes later as Mark Yeates blasted a drive into the other bottom corner, this soon became a 3–1 lead to Bradford when Raffaele De Vita's cross was bundled into the net by Rory McArdle. Alan Connell rounded off the scoring by slotting home a shot to make it 4–1. The second game on the Irish tour saw the Bantams face Bohemians, City once again went behind however this time it wasn't an own goal but rather an opposition player heading the ball in. This 1–0 lead was soon rubbed out by an equalizer to Garry Thompson who headed home a Jason Kennedy cross. Just after halftime the Bradford side dominated and this dominance paid off as Michael Nelson scored to make it 2–1. Youngster Louis Swain also added a goal before the game was wrapped up by a goal from Nahki Wells to ensure the Bantams won 4–1.

Bradford came back to England to face Grimsby Town, it was a hard-fought match and it took the Bantams until the 60th minute to score when James Hanson tapped in Garry Thompson's cross. Then Mark Yeates scored near the full-time whistle as he curled as free-kick into the bottom corner. Bradford won the game 2–0 and that meant they were unbeaten in 4 pre-season games. This run came to an end as the Bantams faced EFL Championship side Doncaster Rovers at Valley Parade. The Rovers took the lead in the 23rd minute but Bradford bounced back as Garry Thompson charged down the goalkeepers kick and the ball rolled into the net. However Doncaster scored with 5 minutes to go to ensure that Bradford lost for the first time this pre-season. A young Bradford side lost 2–1 to Harrogate Town in the final pre-season match before facing Huddersfield Town. Harrogate took the lead after 5 minutes but pressure from the Bantams allowed them to equalize with a Nathan Curtis goal, however soon after Harrogate took a 2–1 lead which they kept hold of despite some good chances from City.

League One
The fixtures for the 2013–14 season were released on 19 June at 09:00 BST.

Bradford's League One campaign started with a 2–2 draw against Bristol City, after going behind last season's top scorer Nahki Wells equalized before Bristol scored their second. However Rory McArdle headed in a cross to make sure the Bantams got a point from the match. The Bantams first home game was a 4–0 win against Carlisle United, Bradford raced into a 3–0 lead after half an hour with Mark Yeates scoring a spectacular goal followed by goals from Nahki Wells and James Hanson before Gary Jones added a second half goal. Bradford's first loss of the season came against Port Vale as the Bantams went down 2–1, their only goal coming from in form striker Nahki Wells. Bradford bounced back from this defeat with an outstanding 2–0 win over Yorkshire rivals Sheffield United with Wells scoring both of the Bantams goals. Bradford's last game of September was a 1–1 draw with Stevenage, the Bantams trailed earlier on due to a penalty but just after halftime Kyel Reid scored to equalize to ensure Bradford came away with a point.

September started great for Bradford as two James Hanson goals (followed by one each from Nahki Wells and Garry Thompson) ensured that they came away with a 4–0 win against Brentford. This performance was backed up by a 2–2 draw against Colchester United with Nahki Wells netting both times. A solitary goal from skipper Gary Jones was enough to secure a 1–0 win against Gillingham. The month ended on a high as Bradford beat Shrewsbury Town 2–1 thanks to a late 90th-minute winner from James Hanson after Kyel Reid had nabbed an equalizer earlier on in the game, this win took the Bantams to 5th place in the league.

Fixtures

League table

FA Cup
City will enter the FA Cup at the First Round stage with the other League One and Two clubs. The draw was made in October and the Bantams were drawn against Rotherham United. Bradford lost 3–0 after Rotherham played some good football to take an early lead.

League Cup
City will enter the League Cup at the First Round stage. The draw for the first round was made on 17 June 2013 and the Bantams were drawn away against local EFL Championship side Huddersfield Town.

Bradford City were runners up in last years League Cup campaign however this time they failed to progress through the first round as Huddersfield Town beat them 2–1. Huddersfield went 2–0 up thanks to a brace from James Vaughan before Nahki Wells scored a consolation goal in the 15th minute.

Football League Trophy
City will begin their Football League Trophy campaign in the First Round stage along with the other clubs from League One and League Two.

The Bantams were drawn against League Two side Hartlepool United for the First Round however they were knocked out as the League Two side hammered the Bantams 5–0 with ex Bradford players Jack Compton and Nialle Rodney among the scorers.

Squad statistics

Statistics accurate as of 3 May 2014

Transfers

In

Loan In

Loan Out

Out

See also
List of Bradford City A.F.C. seasons

References

Bradford City A.F.C. seasons
Bradford City